UHI may refer to:
 Uganda Heart Institute in Kampala
 Universal Handy Interface from Motorola
 U-Haul U-Haul International 
 University of the Highlands and Islands, formerly known as UHI Millennium Institute
 Urban heat island